MadC (born Claudia Walde, 1980) is a graffiti writer and muralist. She was born in Bautzen, Germany, and is most known for her large-scale, outdoor artistic paintings.

MadC started as a teenage graffiti writer and has since developed her creative endeavors into various related fields (including as graphic design, writing, and fine art). MadC painted her first graffiti piece in 1996, being 16 years old. She studied at Burg Giebichenstein University of Art and Design in Halle and Central Saint Martins College in London. MadC carries a master's degree in graphic design.

Philosophy 
It is MadC's philosophy that graffiti is the greatest way to express one's self due to the fact that the end product is all that matters and that no one has to know your true identity.

Major works

Books (as Claudia Walde) 
Sticker City – Paper Graffiti Art (2007)
Street Fonts - Graffiti Alphabets From Around The World (2011). Work from 154 artists, ranging from 30 different countries. In the creation of the book, MadC directed artists to use international alphabets that she had spent two years traveling the world to collect.
Mural XXL (2015)

700 Wall 
Her major international breakthrough came however in 2010 with the production of the work that has become known as the “700-Wall” – a 700 square-meter work along the train line between Berlin and Halle. This painting is most likely the largest graffiti mural created by a single person, taking four months to finish.

Art style 
MadC's transition from street art to gallery work went through a transformation, as she explains "taking the street energy to a canvas and how spray paint translated differently onto canvas". She later moved on to 'Spectra' Paint, which had a transparent effect on her work with spray paint. She has also been known to use ink, watercolor, acrylic paint and acrylic markers in her work.

Her tagging style incorporates science fiction and fantasy elements, and is influenced by such artists as Vincent Van Gogh and the late graffiti artist Dare (real name Siegfried von Koeding, whom she collaborated with on his piece “Basel”). Walde dedicated her piece “6313 – Here to Stay” to Dare.

Mad C also works with spray paints on canvas. At her first solo gallery in 2015, Night and Day, she showcased works such as “Nineteen Nineteen” and “Twenty One Zero Six”. These works had either a black or white base (symbolic of her night and day work required of her for tagging), and investigated “the relationship between overlapping colors, light, glass and calligraphic movement”. For her canvases she is transferring her philosophy of connecting single parts to one piece – background, foreground, lines and shapes. To create those works, MadC uses spray paint, transparent spray paint, ink, watercolor, acrylic paint and acrylic markers. She is painting on canvas as well as carton from spray paint boxes.

After "700 Wall", MadC became ready to start building another aesthetic universe. This is exactly what she did with a new body of work, which was part of the Reflections show at Kolly Gallery in 2014 and The Tahiti Mural in Tahiti during the same year. The seemingly reduced aesthetics of MadC’s canvases and street artwork show a devotion to the exploration of roots of an entire subculture. MadC confronts us with the notion of addressing the essence of graffiti and street art cultures, in a way that highlights the importance of a never-ending (re)interpretation of the two concepts. A “traditional” subject matter is re-contextualized into a completely new visual language. 
 2013: Shoreditch and Chance, East London
 2013: Le Mur Paris (France)
 2013: 500Wall (Germany), Graffiti
 2019: 18-story mural New Jersey

Exhibitions 
 2011: "MadABC", Pure Evil Gallery, London
 2011: "Between the Lines", La Grille Gallery, Yverdon, Switzerland
 2012: "Paper Party", Galerie Le Feuvre, Paris
 2012: "Team Rex", Red Gallery, London
 2012: "layers", 44309 Galerie, Dortmund, Germany
 2012: "Over the Edge", 1AM Gallery, San Francisco, CA
 2013: "Urban Contemporary Art", Galerie Le Feuvre, Paris
 2013: "Billboard Painters", Galleri NB, Viborg, Denmark
 2013: "Innovative Art", Reutov Museum, Reutov, Russia
 2014: "First Taste", Wallworks New York, New York City
 2014: "Reflections", Kolly Gallery, Zurich, Switzerland
 2015: "Bits and Pieces", Wallworks New York, New York City
 2015: "Character", Pure Evil Gallery, London
 2015: "Night and Day", 44309 Street Art Gallery, Dortmund, Germany
 2015: "Who's Your Daddy?" (group show), Lausanne, Switzerland
 2015: "The Bright Side of Life", Galerie Brugier-Rigail, Paris
 2016: "Home Sweet Home", Galerie Brugier-Rigail, Paris
 2016: "Kaleidoscope", Kolly Gallery, Zurich, Switzerland
 2017: "Radius", Urban Nation, Berlin
 2017: "Urban Art Biennale", Völklinger Hütte, Saarbrücken, Germany
2017: „For The Love of Freedom“ Art and Museum Centre Sinkka, Finland
 2018, „Daydreaming“, 44309 Street Art Gallery, Dortmund, Germany
2018: "Rakkaudesta vapauteen" The Oulu Museum Of Art, Oulu, Finland 
2019: "Dialog" Brenners Park-Hotel, Baden-Baden, Germany
2019: "Conquête Urbaine" Fine Arts Museum of Calais, France

Bibliography 
 Sticker City Thames & Hudson, London, 2007, .
 Street Fonts - Graffiti Alphabets from Around the World Thames & Hudson, London, 2011, .
 Graffiti and Street Art Anna Wacławek, Thames & Hudson, London, 2011, 
 Mural XXL Thames & Hudson, London 2015, 
Madc: Street to Canvas Heni Publishing, 2021,

References

External links 
 MadC personal website 
 MadC at hallenkunst.de

German artists
German graffiti artists
German women artists
Women graffiti artists
Women muralists